The Council of Ministers of Burundi are the  senior level of the executive branch of Burundi and consists of the Prime Minister of Burundi and various Ministers. The 2018 constitution, which enshrines ethnically-based power-sharing, requires that at most 60% of ministers come from the ethnic Hutu majority and at most 40% hail from the Tutsi minority. At least 30% of government ministers must be women. The members of the council are directly appointed by the President in consultation with the Vice-President and Prime minister.  

The current council of ministers commenced on 28 June 2020 and was President Évariste Ndayishimiye's first cabinet.

Members of the government named in 2020
President Évariste Ndayishimiye's first council was a total of 15 ministers of which 5 were women.

Members of the Government named in 2010
The president Pierre Nkurunziza named a new government on August 30, 2010. The newly formed government consisted of 21 ministers, out of which 10 were members of the previous government.

Members of the government named in 2007
In 2007 the Government of Burundi consisted of a 20-member Council of Ministers appointed by the President. The Council of Ministers, together with the President and Vice-Presidents, forms the executive branch of government in the country.

Members of President Pierre Nkurunziza's government were announced on 14 November 2007. The government consisted of 12 men (8 Hutus and 4 Tutsis) and 8 women (6 Hutus and 2 Tutsis). The ethnic composition was 14 Hutus and 6 Tutsis. A new government was announced on August 29, 2010.

See also
Burundi
Rulers and heads of state of Burundi
Heads of government of Burundi
Vice-Presidents of Burundi
Burundi elections, 2005
History of Burundi

References